Austin Powers: Welcome to My Underground Lair! is a simulation video game developed by Tarantula Studios and published by Rockstar Games that is based on the Austin Powers film series. It released exclusively for the Game Boy Color in North America on 18 September 2000 and in Europe on 3 November 2000. Like Rockstar's Austin Powers: Oh, Behave!, which released simultaneously with Welcome to My Underground Lair!, the game features mini-games and applications housed in a simulation of a desktop computer that belongs to a character from the series, specifically Dr. Evil, the antagonist of the film series. It includes save functionality, sound clips from the films, compatibility with the Game Boy Printer, Nintendo Game Link Cable support, and multiplayer functionality with Oh, Behave! through the Game Boy Color's infrared communications port.

Gameplay
Mini-games included are Mojo Maze, a Pac-Man-style maze game; Domination, an Austin Powers-themed version of Reversi; and a digitized version of Rock-Paper-Scissors. 'Kin'-Evil, a motorbike racing game whose name is a play on Evel Knievel, is also available. IGN noted that this mini-game is similar to Evel Knievel, another Game Boy Color game developed by Tarantula Studios and published by Rockstar Games. The desktop computer mode features customizable backgrounds, themes, sounds, and screensavers, a movie clip, a calculator, and simulated Internet with information on the Austin Powers films and the actors.

Reception

Austin Powers: Welcome to My Underground Lair! received mostly poor reviews. IGN'''s Chris Carle rated the game 3 out of 10, calling it "derivative and boring" and a "shameless abuse of a license". Carle concluded, "Let's put it this way: I'd rather drink what's in the beaker than play this game for an extended period of time." The Tampa Bay Times'' rated it an F, with the reviewer stating, "I'd take it, but only for $1 million."

References

External links
 

2000 video games
Welcome to My Underground Lair!
Game Boy Color games
Game Boy Color-only games
Multiplayer and single-player video games
Rockstar Games games
Take-Two Interactive games
Video games developed in the United Kingdom